First Lake is a lake east of Bisby Lodge in Herkimer County, New York. It drains southwest via an unnamed creek which flows into Second Lake.

See also
 List of lakes in New York

References 

Lakes of New York (state)
Lakes of Herkimer County, New York